Ammianus Marcellinus (occasionally anglicised as Ammian) (born , died 400) was a Roman soldier and historian who wrote the penultimate major historical account surviving from antiquity (preceding Procopius). His work, known as the Res Gestae, chronicled in Latin the history of Rome from the accession of the Emperor Nerva in 96 to the death of Valens at the Battle of Adrianople in 378, although only the sections covering the period 353 to 378 survive.

Biography

Ammianus was born in the East Mediterranean, possibly in Syria or Phoenicia, around 330. His native language is unknown but he likely knew Greek as well as Latin. The surviving books of his history cover the years 353 to 378.

Ammianus served as an officer in the army of the emperors Constantius II and Julian. He served in Gaul (Julian) and in the east (twice for Constantius, once under Julian). He professes to have been "a former soldier and a Greek" (miles quondam et graecus), and his enrollment among the elite protectores domestici (household guards) shows that he was of middle class or higher birth. Consensus is that Ammianus probably came from a curial family, but it is also possible that he was the son of a comes Orientis of the same family name. He entered the army at an early age, when Constantius II was emperor of the East, and was sent to serve under Ursicinus, governor of Nisibis in Mesopotamia, and magister militum. Ammianus campaigned in the East twice under Ursicinus.

He travelled with Ursicinus to Italy when Ursicinus was called on by Constantius to begin an expedition against Silvanus. Silvanus had been forced by the allegedly false accusations of his enemies into proclaiming himself emperor in Gaul. Ursicinus had one of his men assassinate Silvanus, restoring Gaul to Constantius. He then stayed in Gaul to help install Julian as Caesar of Gaul, Spain and Britain. Ammianus probably met Julian for the first time while serving on Ursicinus' staff in Gaul.

In 359 Constantius sent Ursicinus back to the east to help in the defence against a Persian invasion led by king Shapur II himself. Ammianus returned with his commander to the East and again served Ursicinus as a staff officer. Ursicinus, although he was the more experienced commander, was placed under the command of Sabinianus, the Magister Peditum of the east. The two did not get along, resulting in a lack of cooperation between the Limitanei (border regiments) of Mesopotamia and Osrhoene under Ursicinus' command and the comitatus (field army) of Sabinianus. While on a mission near Nisibis, Ammianus spotted a Persian patrol which was about to try and capture Ursicinus, he was able to warn his commander in time. In an attempt to locate the Persian Royal Army Ursicinus sent Ammianus to Jovinianus, the semi-independent governor of Corduene, and a friend of Ursicinus. Ammianus successfully located the Persian main body and reported his findings to Ursicinus.

After his mission in Corduene, Ammianus accompanied his commander when the latter rode out from his headquarters at Amida on a mission to make sure the bridges across the Euphrates were demolished. They were attacked by the Persian vanguard who had made a night march in an attempt to catch the Romans at Amida off guard. After a protracted cavalry battle the Romans were scattered, Ursicinus evaded capture and fled to Melitene while Ammianus barely made it back to Amida with a wounded comrade. The Persians started to besiege the city. When it fell Ammianus barely escaped with his life.

When Ursicinus was dismissed from his military post by Constantius, Ammianus too seems to have retired from the military; however, reevaluation of his participation in Julian's Persian campaign has led modern scholarship to suggest that he continued his service but did not for some reason include the period in his history.
He accompanied Julian, for whom he expresses enthusiastic admiration, in his campaigns against the Alamanni and the Sassanids.
After Julian's death, Ammianus accompanied the retreat of the new emperor, Jovian, as far as Antioch.
He was residing in Antioch in 372 when a certain Theodorus was thought to have been identified the successor to the emperor Valens by divination.
Speaking as an alleged eyewitness, Marcellinus recounts how Theodorus and several others were made to confess their deceit through the use of torture, and cruelly punished.

He eventually settled in Rome and began the Res Gestae. The precise year of his death is unknown, but scholarly consensus places it somewhere between 392 and 400 at the latest.

Modern scholarship generally describes Ammianus as a pagan who was tolerant of Christianity. Marcellinus writes of Christianity as being a "plain and simple" religion that demands only what is just and mild, and when he condemns the actions of Christians, he does not do so on the basis of their Christianity as such. His lifetime was marked by lengthy outbreaks of sectarian and dogmatic strife within the new state-backed faith, often with violent consequences (especially the Arian controversy) and these conflicts sometimes appeared unworthy to him, though it was territory where he could not risk going very far in criticism, due to the growing and volatile political connections between the church and imperial power.

Ammianus was not blind to the faults of Christians or of pagans and was especially critical of them; he commented that "no wild beasts are so hostile to men as Christian sects in general are to one another" and he condemns the emperor Julian for excessive attachment to (pagan) sacrifice, and for his edict effectively barring Christians from teaching posts.

Work
While living in Rome in the 380s, Ammianus wrote a Latin history of the Roman empire from the accession of Nerva (96) to the death of Valens at the Battle of Adrianople (378), in effect writing a continuation of the history of Tacitus. He presumably completed the work before 391, as at 22.16.12 he praises the Serapeum of Alexandria in Egypt as the glory of the empire; it was in that same year the Emperor granted the temple grounds to a Christian bishop, provoking pagans into barricading themselves in the temple, plundering its contents, and torturing Christians, ultimately destroying the temple.

The Res Gestae (Rerum gestarum Libri XXXI) was originally composed of thirty-one books, but the first thirteen have been lost. The surviving eighteen books cover the period from 353 to 378. It constitutes the foundation of modern understanding of the history of the fourth century Roman Empire. It is lauded as a clear, comprehensive, and generally impartial account of events by a contemporary; like many ancient historians, however, Ammianus was in fact not impartial, although he expresses an intention to be so, and had strong moral and religious prejudices. Although criticised as lacking literary merit by his early biographers, he was in fact quite skilled in rhetoric, which significantly has brought the veracity of some of the Res Gestae into question.

His work has suffered substantially from manuscript transmission. Aside from the loss of the first thirteen books, the remaining eighteen are in many places corrupt and lacunose. The sole surviving manuscript from which almost every other is derived is a ninth-century Carolingian text, Vatican lat. 1873 (V), produced in Fulda from an insular exemplar. The only independent textual source for Ammianus lies in Fragmenta Marbugensia (M), another ninth-century Frankish codex which was taken apart to provide covers for account-books during the fifteenth century. Only six leaves of M survive; however, before this manuscript was dismantled the Abbot of Hersfeld lent the manuscript to Sigismund Gelenius, who used it in preparing the text of the second Froben edition (G). The dates and relationship of V and M were long disputed until 1936 when R. P. Robinson demonstrated persuasively that V was copied from M. As L. D. Reynolds summarizes, "M is thus a fragment of the archetype; symptoms of an insular pre-archetype are evident."

His handling from his earliest printers was little better. The editio princeps was printed in 1474 in Rome by Georg Sachsel and Bartholomaeus Golsch, which broke off at the end of Book 26. The next edition (Bologna, 1517) suffered from its editor's conjectures upon the poor text of the 1474 edition; the 1474 edition was pirated for the first Froben edition (Basle, 1518). It was not until 1533 that the last five books of Ammianus' history were put into print by Silvanus Otmar and edited by Mariangelus Accursius. The first modern edition was produced by C.U. Clark (Berlin, 1910–1913). The first English translations were by Philemon Holland in 1609, and later by C.D. Yonge in 1862.

Reception

Edward Gibbon judged Ammianus "an accurate and faithful guide, who composed the history of his own times without indulging the prejudices and passions which usually affect the mind of a contemporary." But he also condemned Ammianus for lack of literary flair: "The coarse and undistinguishing pencil of Ammianus has delineated his bloody figures with tedious and disgusting accuracy." Austrian historian Ernst Stein praised Ammianus as "the greatest literary genius that the world produced between Tacitus and Dante".

According to Kimberly Kagan, his accounts of battles emphasize the experience of the soldiers but at the cost of ignoring the bigger picture.  As a result, it is difficult for the reader to understand why the battles he describes had the outcome they did.

Ammianus' work contains a detailed description of the earthquake and tsunami of 365 in Alexandria, which devastated the metropolis and the shores of the eastern Mediterranean on 21 July 365. His report describes accurately the characteristic sequence of earthquake, retreat of the sea, and sudden incoming giant wave.

Notes

Citations

Sources

External links

 
 
 Works by Ammianus Marcellinus at Perseus Digital Library
 Ammianus Marcellinus on-line project
 Ammianus Marcellinus' works in Latin at the Latin Library
 Ammianus Marcellinus' works in English at the Tertullian Project with introduction on the manuscripts
 Bibliography for Ammianus Marcellinus at Bibliographia Latina Selecta compiled by M.G.M. van der Poel

330 births
390s deaths
4th-century births
4th-century Greek people
4th-century historians
4th-century Latin writers
4th-century Romans
Ancient Greeks in Rome
Ancient Roman equites
Ancient Roman soldiers
Late-Roman-era pagans
Latin historians
People of Roman Syria
People of the Roman–Sasanian Wars
Roman-era Greeks

Year of birth uncertain
Year of death unknown